Manfredi Aliquò (born 12 June 1958) is an Italian actor and voice actor.

Biography
Born in Rome, Aliquò attended the Silvio D'Amico National Academy of Dramatic Arts and began acting on stage during the early 1980s. He has taken part in events such as Festival dei Due Mondi and he has starred in plays directed by Aldo Trionfo, Pino Quartullo and Gabriele Lavia, among others.

On screen, Aliquò is well known for portraying Castor in the historical drama television series Rome and he also made appearances in Un commissario a Roma, Provaci ancora prof! and many more. He even made at least five film appearances and has also enjoyed success as a voice actor, as he is renowned for providing the Italian voice of Apu Nahasapeemapetilon in The Simpsons.

Filmography

Cinema
The Mass Is Ended (1985)
Man on Fire (1987)
The Comfort of Strangers (1990)
The Council of Egypt (2002)
Ex – Amici come prima! (2011)

Television
La fuggitiva (?)Il caso Renzi-Aristarco (1984)Cinema che follia! (1987)Blue Blood (1988)Un bambino in fuga - Tre anni dopo (1991)Un commissario a Roma (1992)Passioni (1993)Pazza famiglia (1994)Il Barone (1995)La voce del cuore (1995)In nome della famiglia (1997)Primo cittadino (1997)Gli eredi (1997)Ama il tuo nemico (1999)Incantesimo (1999)Camici bianchi (2000)Classmates (2001)La squadra (2003/07)Carabinieri (2003)I Married a Footballer (2005)Rome (2005/07)L'onore e il rispetto (2006/09)Gente di mare (2007)Piper (2009)La nuova squadra (2010)A fari spenti nella notte (2012)Provaci ancora prof! (2013)

Dubbing roles
Animation
Apu Nahasapeemapetilon in The SimpsonsApu Nahasapeemapetilon in The Simpsons MovieAmbrister Minion in RatatouilleAndy Dick in Where My Dogs At?The Royal Advisor in MinionsMr.Wilter in ChalkZoneLive action
Zit Boy in Liar LiarTeddy Pollack in Best MenNational Enquirer photographer in The BirdcageChapeau in Beauty and the BeastBoothe in DeadpoolMutant Organiser in X-Men: The Last StandDetective McCann in American GangsterSaul Mineroff in The InfiltratorShayes in Mercury RisingWilliam Tompkins in Bridge of SpiesFrank in Road to PerditionTom Wallace in Scream 3Store Clerk in Dead AgainVideo games
Apu Nahasapeemapetilon in The Simpsons Game''

References

External links

1958 births
Living people
Male actors from Rome
Italian male film actors
Italian male television actors
Italian male stage actors
Italian male voice actors
Italian male video game actors
20th-century Italian male actors
21st-century Italian male actors
Accademia Nazionale di Arte Drammatica Silvio D'Amico alumni
Sapienza University of Rome alumni